The Mark of the Berserker is the fourth serial of the second series of the British science fiction television series The Sarah Jane Adventures. It was first broadcast in two weekly parts on CBBC on 3 and 10 November 2008. Due to Elisabeth Sladen's commitments elsewhere, main character Sarah Jane Smith has a minor role in this serial, making the episodes similar to the 'Doctor-lite' episodes of Doctor Who ("Love & Monsters", "Blink" and “Turn Left") which do not feature The Doctor heavily, as well as the Torchwood episode "Random Shoes", which had minor roles for most of the main cast.

Plot
Jacob, an unpopular pupil at school, finds an alien pendant. He begins using it to control other people, while leaving a strange blue handmark on his palm. Rani finds the pendant in the school bathroom and, upon learning its effects, leaves it in Sarah Jane's attic.

Meanwhile, Clyde's father Paul returns to Clyde's house, years after leaving his family for Clyde's aunt in Germany. Clyde takes Paul to the attic to prove he fights aliens. Paul pockets the pendant, and uses it to force Rani's father Haresh to do push ups indefinitely. When Luke and Rani turn up, Paul uses the pendant to make Clyde forget about Luke, Rani, and Clyde's mother Carla, and the two drive off to travel the world. Paul uses the pendant to steal expensive objects to bond with Clyde.

In Washington D.C., Alan hacks into UNIT's database to find a match of a drawing of the pendant Luke and Rani send to him. They discover that the pendant belongs to a race of alien warriors known as the Berserkers, and that using the pendant can change the user into one of them, including marking their hands and turning their veins blue.

Luke, Rani, Carla, and Sarah Jane (who Alan tracked down by hacking into hospital records) follow Clyde and Paul to the marina. The pendant begins to possess Paul and transform him into a Berserker, and Paul declares that he and Clyde will fight in a war. Clyde and Carla talk Paul through his memories, whilst Sarah Jane shows him a reflection of himself in the mirror, and he remembers who he is. Everyone whom the pendant commanded has their commands undone. Paul returns to Germany to raise his unborn child. Clyde tells Carla to forget about what she knows about Sarah Jane's adventures with her son. Clyde throws the pendant into the sea.

Continuity
 Sarah Jane states that she is visiting Tarminster. Tarminster is featured in the Doctor Who serial Terror of the Autons. The Harold Saxon promotional website mentions that Lucy Saxon's father was Lord Cole of Tarminster.
Clyde stirs Sarah Jane's memories of her own parents, whom she longs to have known. This foreshadows the plot of the next episode.

References

External links

The official BBC The Sarah Jane Adventures website
Press Pack information regarding The Mark of the Berserker at the BBC Press Office website

The Sarah Jane Adventures episodes
2008 British television episodes
Television episodes about psychic powers
Fiction about mind control